Grand Hotel Yerevan, also known as GHY is a 5-star hotel in the central Kentron District of Yerevan, Armenia. It was opened in 1926, during the Soviet period, as a state-owned enterprise. It is one of the oldest hotels in modern Armenia, as well as the oldest functioning Hotel in Yerevan.

The hotel is located on 14 Abovyan Street, overlooking the Charles Aznavour Square is adjacent to the Artists' Union of Armenia.

History
The hotel was opened in 1926 as a state-owned hotel of the Armenian SSR, based on the design of architect Nikolai Buniatian. It was known as the "Intourist Hotel", named after the Intourist agency, which was the regulating body of the hotels and tourism within the Soviet Union. Thus, Yerevan Hotel became the first hotel that was opened within Soviet Armenia.

During the 1930s, the hotel became the regular meeting place of the intellectuals of the city including Yeghishe Charents, Yervand Kochar and Vahram Papazian.

In 1959, the Intourist agency was transferred to the newly opened Armenia Hotel at the Republic Square, and the Intourist Hotel came to be known as the "Yerevan Hotel".

After the collapse of the USSR, Yerevan Hotel was acquired by the Italian company Renco S.p.A., and after a major renovation it was reopened as the 4-star  "Golden Tulip Hotel Yerevan" in 1999, operated by the Groupe du Louvre. In 2009, following a major renovation, the structure was upgraded to a 5-star hotel to become known as the Royal Tulip Grand Hotel Yerevan until the end of 2016.

Grand Hotel Yerevan is currently managed by the Small Luxury Hotels of the World since the beginning of 2017.

Gallery

References

Hotels established in 1926
Hotel buildings completed in 1926
Hotels in Yerevan